The 1946 Massachusetts gubernatorial election was held on November 5, 1946. Republican Robert F. Bradford defeated Democratic incumbent Maurice J. Tobin, Socialist Labor candidate Horace Hillis, and Prohibition candidate Guy S. Williams.

Democratic primary
Governor Tobin defeated Francis D. Harrigan, a senior partner with the law firm of Caulfield, Harrigan and Murray, associate editor of the Association of Trial Lawyers of America's Law Journal, and a World War I veteran, for the Democratic nomination.

Republican primary
Lieutenant Governor Robert F. Bradford won the Republican gubernatorial nomination unopposed.

General election

Results

See also
1946 Massachusetts general election
 1945–1946 Massachusetts legislature

References

Governor
1946
Massachusetts governor
November 1946 events in the United States